The 2000-01 Four Hills Tournament took place at the four traditional venues of Oberstdorf, Garmisch-Partenkirchen, Innsbruck and Bischofshofen, located in Germany and Austria, between 29 December 2000 and 6 January 2001.

Results

Overall

References

External links 
 Official website 

Four Hills Tournament
2000 in ski jumping
2001 in ski jumping
2000 in German sport
2001 in German sport
2001 in Austrian sport